Lorrenzo Manzin (born 26 July 1994) is a French cyclist, who currently rides for UCI ProTeam .

He joined  in 2015 with a 2-year contract after riding for the team the previous season as a stagiaire. On 26 April 2015, Manzin sprinted to his first professional victory at La Roue Tourangelle. He was named in the start list for the 2015 Vuelta a España, where he withdrew during the tenth stage.

Major results

2012
 1st Boucles de Trélon
 1st Stage 3 Tour de La Réunion
 1st Points classification Trofeo Karlsberg
2013
 1st  Overall Tour de La Réunion
1st Prologue (TTT) & Stage 6 (ITT)
 1st Grand Prix de Cherves
2014 
 1st Boucles Catalan
 1st Stage 2 Boucle de l'Artois
 1st Stage 2 Tour de l'Eure-et-Loire
 2nd SportBreizh
2015
 1st La Roue Tourangelle
 8th Grand Prix de Denain
2016
 5th Grand Prix de Denain
 9th Trofeo Playa de Palma
2017
 3rd Grand Prix de la Somme
2018
 1st Stage 4 Tour du Limousin 
 2nd Paris–Troyes
 3rd Polynormande
 6th Brussels Cycling Classic
 7th Primus Classic
 8th Overall Tour de Wallonie
 8th Paris–Camembert
 8th Elfstedenronde
2019
 1st  Overall Tour de Bretagne
1st Points classification
 1st Grand Prix de la Somme
 2nd Overall La Tropicale Amissa Bongo
1st Stages 4 & 7
 3rd Circuito de Getxo
 9th Boucles de l'Aulne
2020
 1st Stage 7 La Tropicale Amissa Bongo
2021
 1st Clàssica Comunitat Valenciana 1969
 5th Paris–Camembert
 10th La Roue Tourangelle
2022
 1st Stage 4 Tour Poitou-Charentes en Nouvelle-Aquitaine
 5th Cholet-Pays de la Loire
 8th La Roue Tourangelle
 8th Omloop van het Houtland
 10th Eschborn–Frankfurt
2023
 3rd Cholet-Pays de la Loire

Grand Tour general classification results timeline

References

External links

1994 births
Living people
French male cyclists
Sportspeople from Saint-Denis, Réunion
Cyclists from Réunion